Applied physics is the application of physics to solve scientific or engineering problems. It is usually considered to be a bridge or a connection between physics and engineering.
"Applied" is distinguished from "pure" by a subtle combination of factors, such as the motivation and attitude of researchers and the nature of the relationship to the technology or science that may be affected by the work. Applied physics is rooted in the fundamental truths and basic concepts of the physical sciences, but is concerned with the utilization of scientific principles in practical devices and systems, and in the application of physics in other areas of science and high technology.

Examples of research and development areas
Accelerator physics
Acoustics
Atmospheric physics
Biophysics
Brain–computer interfacing
Chemical physics
Differentiable programming
Artificial intelligence
Scientific computing
Engineering physics
Chemical engineering
Electrical engineering
Electronics
Sensors
Transistors
Materials science and engineering
Metamaterials
Nanotechnology
Semiconductors
Thin films
Mechanical engineering
Aerospace engineering
Astrodynamics
Electromagnetic propulsion
Fluid mechanics
Military engineering
Lidar
Radar
Sonar
Stealth technology
Nuclear engineering
Fission reactors
Fusion reactors
Optical engineering
Photonics
Cavity optomechanics
Lasers
Photonic crystals
Geophysics
Materials physics
Medical physics
Health physics
Radiation dosimetry
Medical imaging
Magnetic resonance imaging
Radiation therapy
Microscopy
Scanning probe microscopy
Atomic force microscopy
Scanning tunneling microscopy
Scanning electron microscopy
Transmission electron microscopy
Nuclear physics
Fission
Fusion
Optical physics
Nonlinear optics
Quantum optics
Plasma physics
Quantum technology
Quantum computing
Quantum cryptography
Renewable energy
Spectroscopy

See also
Applied science
Applied mathematics
Engineering
Engineering Physics
High Technology

References

 
Engineering disciplines